Euriphene ituriensis is a butterfly in the family Nymphalidae. It is found in the Democratic Republic of the Congo (northern Kivu and Ituri).

References

Butterflies described in 1957
Euriphene
Endemic fauna of the Democratic Republic of the Congo
Butterflies of Africa